The Utica Curling Club is located in Whitesboro, New York.  The club was founded in 1868 and is one of the oldest curling clubs in the United States.  A member of the Grand National Curling Club (GNCC), the Utica Curling Club is the largest curling club on the East Coast, and has 6 sheets of ice and over 200 members. In 1916 it became the permanent host of the Mitchell Men's bonspiel.

History

1832 Outdoor curling began on a frozen pond in Clark Mills, New York
1868 Utica Curling Club is founded
1890 An enclosed curling shed was constructed
1911 Mitchell Bonspiel played for the first time
1916 An indoor club was built on Francis Street in Utica, New York
1995 The Francis Street club was destroyed by fire
1996 A new facility opened at 8300 Clark Mills Road, Whitesboro, New York

References

Drawn from the booklet created by Tom Garber for the 125th anniversary of the club,  "A Half Century with the Glengarries" by Anne Burchesky, and club archives.

External links
 Utica Curling Club - Official Website

Curling clubs established in 1868
Curling clubs in the United States
Curling Club
1868 establishments in New York (state)
Curling in New York (state)